The Freedom and Accord Party, also known as the Liberal Union or the Liberal Entente, was a liberal Ottoman political party active between 1911 and 1913, during the Second Constitutional Era. It was the most significant opposition to Union and Progress in the Chamber of Deputies. The political programme of the party advocated for Ottomanism, government decentralisation, the rights of ethnic minorities, and close relations with Britain. In the post-1918 Ottoman Empire, the party became known for its attempts to suppress and prosecute the CUP.

Name 
The Freedom and Accord Party is sometimes conflated with its predecessor, the Liberty Party, and the two organizations are often known collectively as the Liberal Union or the Liberal Entente. In the Ottoman Empire, its members were known as İtilâfçılar or Itilafists, who were opposed to members of the rival Union and Progress Party İttihadcılar or Ittihadists (literally Unionists).

Base and members 
Albanians from the Ottoman Empire played a prominent role in the party, such as Basri Bey Dukagjini from Debre (modern Debar), Hasan Prishtina and Midhat Frashëri (the son of Abdyl Frashëri, who served as a deputy representative for the Yanya Vilayet in the Ottoman Parliament) who were among its eleven founders. Notable members included Prince Sabahaddin, Kâmil Pasha, Rıza Tevfik Bölükbaşı, Ali Kemal, Refik Halit Karay, Rıza Nur, Mehmed Hâdî Pasha, Damat Ferid Pasha, Mehmed Rauf Pasha, Mizancı Murat, Gümülcineli İsmail, Reşat Halis, and Lütfi Fikri.

Origins 
Prince Sabahattin's , which advocated for administrative decentralization, eventually organized itself into the Liberty Party to participate in the 1908 election, proving to be the Committee of Union and Progress's (CUP) main opponent. It was suppressed and eventually disbanded following the 31 March Incident. Various smaller parties existed between 1910 and 1911 that proved to be ineffective as opposition to the CUP.

History

1911–1913 
In mid-October, many of the parliament's most esteemed politicians: Unionists Hakkı Pasha, Mehmed Talat, Mehmet Cavid, Halil Menteşe and oppositionists Krikor Zohrab, Vartkes Serengülian, and Karekin Pastermajian met, where the main discussion was the CUP's commitment to the Constitution and more cooperation between the CUP and the opposition rather than incessant intervention by the CUP in government. When this proposal was rejected by the Committee, the opposition coalesced around into the Freedom and Accord Party. It declared itself a party on November 21 1911 and immediately attracted 70 deputies to its ranks. 

Only 20 days after its formation, Freedom and Accord won a significant by-election in Constantinople by one vote. It was the main challenger to the CUP during the April 1912 elections, which the Committee rigged in favor of itself, giving Freedom and Accord only 6 seats of 275 total. The rigged election caused uprisings in many provinces, until pro-Itilafist officers known as the Savior Officers issued a memorandum to the pro-CUP Grand Vizier Mehmed Said Pasha, who was forced to resign. Ahmed Muhtar Pasha's suprapartisan Great Cabinet followed, which was supported by the Savior Officers and Freedom and Accord. Catastrophe in the First Balkan War lead to the collapse of this government, and Kâmil Pasha, who was an ardent anti-Unionist, returned to the premiership with the hope to sign a more favorable peace settlement in London to end the war, and also to ban the CUP. However the CUP undertook a coup d'état in January 1913, and İsmail Enver forced Kâmil Pasha to resign the premiership at gun point. The Three Pashas (Talat, Cemal, and Enver), gained de facto control of the Empire. 

At the end of March a plot was discovered by an associate of Prince Sabahaddin, forcing Sabahaddin and Dr. Nihat Reşat (Belger) to flee abroad. The CUP took advantage of Grand Vizier Mahmut Şevket Pasha's assassination on 11 June 1913 to crush all opposition completely. Most Itilafists were sentenced to death in absentia. 322 people (601 people according to Burhan Felek), who were known anti-Unionists were exiled to Sinop. 

For 5 years the party was practically defunct, until it was re-established in the aftermath of First World War.

1918–1919 
With the Ottoman Empire losing on all fronts in by the end of WWI, Talat Pasha's government fell. A general amnesty was declared and exiles from Sinop and abroad began to return to Constantinople.  

On November 17, 1918, Mustafa Sabri Efendi a former deputy of Tokat, declared the reorganization of the Freedom and Accord Party. In the following days, news emerged that Freedom and Accord branches were opened in various parts of the country. In a meeting held on January 10, 1919, the Freedom and Accord Party was officially re-established. The new board of directors consisted mostly of elderly and retired state officials close to the palace. Former chairman Damat Ferit Pasha did not join the party. Mustafa Sabri, Ali Kemal, Rıza Tevfik, and Refik Halit (Karay), former and active members of the party, took part in its management. The most important spokespersons of the party in the press were Ali Kemal and Refi Cevat (Ulunay). 

The first cabinet of Damat Ferit Pasha, which was established on March 3, 1919, was generally regarded as the "Government of Freedom and Accord". In reality, the party had no real share in power, except by contributing one or two members to the government. According to Refik Halit (Karay), Ferit Pasha "used the party like a winter cardigan." On June 25, Freedom and Accord's central committee declared that there was no relationship between the government and the party. After this date, the party split into several factions. On July 21, the central committee declared the government of Damat Ferit illegitimate and demanded his immediate resignation. That same day, a wing of the party split off called the Conservatives Party.

In the last Ottoman parliamentary elections held in November 1919, Freedom and Accord and the groups that split from it boycotted the election.

The most notable newspaper known as the media organ of the party is Mes'ûliyet (27 August-15 September 1919), which was only published nineteen issues by Balalı Şehsüvarzâde Hacı Osman Bey, the treasurer of the party.

Elections

References

Notes

Sources

1911 establishments in the Ottoman Empire
Non-governmental organizations involved in the Turkish War of Independence
Political parties in the Ottoman Empire
Turkish nationalist organizations
Young Turks